Ronald Ball, and variants, may refer to:

Ron Ball (born 1950), first elected police commissioner (PCC) for Warwickshire
Ronnie Ball (1927–1984), British jazz musician
Ron Clark Ball (born 1959), American thriller and suspense novelist
Ronald Ball, officer killed alongside Arleigh McCree in a 1986 bomb disposal operation in North Hollywood